Philates is a genus of jumping spiders that was first described by Eugène Louis Simon in 1900.

Species
 it contains ten species, found only in the Philippines, Indonesia, and Papua New Guinea:
Philates chelifer (Simon, 1900) – Indonesia (Java, Borneo)
Philates courti (Zabka, 1999) – New Guinea
Philates grammicus Simon, 1900 (type) – Philippines, Indonesia
Philates platnicki (Zabka, 1999) – New Guinea
Philates proszynskii (Zabka, 1999) – New Guinea
Philates rafalskii (Zabka, 1999) – New Guinea
Philates szutsi Benjamin, 2004 – Borneo
Philates thaleri Benjamin, 2004 – Borneo
Philates variratae (Zabka, 1999) – New Guinea
Philates zschokkei Benjamin, 2004 – Indonesia

References

Salticidae genera
Salticidae
Spiders of Asia